Private press publishing, with respect to books, is an endeavor performed by craft-based expert or aspiring artisans, either amateur or professional, who, among other things, print and build books, typically by hand, with emphasis on design, graphics, layout, fine printing, binding, covers, paper, stitching, and the like.

Description 
The term "private press" is not synonymous with "fine press," "small press," or "university press" – though there are similarities. One similarity shared by all is that they need not meet higher commercial thresholds of commercial presses.  Private presses, however, often have no profit motive.  A similarity shared with fine and small presses, but not university presses, is that for various reasons – namely quality – production quantity is often limited. University presses are typically more automated. A distinguishing quality of private presses is that they enjoy sole discretion over literary, scientific, artistic, and aesthetic merits. Criteria for other types of presses vary. From an aesthetic perspective, critical acclaim and public appreciation of artisans' works from private presses is somewhat analogous to that of luthiers' works of fine string instruments and bows.

Etymological perspective 
The private press movement, and its renowned body of work – relative to the larger world of book arts in Western civilization – is narrow and recent. From one perspective, collections relating to book arts date back to before the High Middle Ages. As an illustration of scope and influence, a 1980 exhibition at Catholic University of America, "The Monastic Imprint," highlighted the influence of book arts and textual scholarship from 1200 to 1980, displaying hundreds of diplomas, manuscript codices, incunabula, printed volumes, and calligraphic and private press ephemera. The displays focused on five areas: (1) Medieval Monasticism, Spirituality, and Scribal Culture, A.D. 1200–1500; (2) Early Printing and the Monastic Scholarly Tradition, ca. 1450–1600; (3) Early modern Monastic Printing and Scholarly Publishing, A.D. 1650–1800; (4) Modern Survivals: Monastic Scriptoria, Private Presses, and Academic Publishing, 1800–1980.

Private press movement 
United Kingdom
The term "private press" is often used to refer to a movement in book production which flourished around the turn of the 20th century under the influence of the scholar-artisans William Morris, Sir Emery Walker and their followers. The movement is often considered to have begun with the founding of Morris' Kelmscott Press in 1890, following a lecture on printing given by Walker at the Arts and Crafts Exhibition Society in November 1888. Morris decried that the Industrial Revolution had ruined man's joy in work and that mechanization, to the extent that it has replaced handicraft, had brought ugliness with it. Those involved in the private press movement created books by traditional printing and binding methods, with an emphasis on the book as a work of art and manual skill, as well as a medium for the transmission of information. Morris was greatly influenced by medieval codices and early printed books and the 'Kelmscott style' had a great, and not always positive, influence on later private presses and commercial book-design. The movement was an offshoot of the Arts and Crafts movement, and represented a rejection of the cheap mechanised book-production methods which developed in the Victorian era. The books were made with high-quality materials (handmade paper, traditional inks and, in some cases, specially designed typefaces), and were often bound by hand. Careful consideration was given to format, page design, type, illustration and binding, to produce a unified whole. The movement dwindled during the worldwide depression of the 1930s, as the market for luxury goods evaporated. Since the 1950s, there has been a resurgence of interest, especially among artists, in the experimental use of letterpress printing, paper-making and hand-bookbinding in producing small editions of 'artists' books', and among amateur (and a few professional) enthusiasts for traditional printing methods and for the production 'values' of the private press movement.

New Zealand
In New Zealand university private presses have been significant in the private press movement. Private presses are active at three New Zealand universities: Auckland (Holloway Press), Victoria (Wai-te-ata Press) and Otago (Otakou Press).

North America
A 1982 Newsweek article about the rebirth of the hand press movement asserted that Harry Duncan was "considered the father of the post-World War II private-press movement." Will Ransom has been credited as the father of American private press historiographers.

Selected history
Quality control
Beyond aesthetics, private presses, historically, have served other needs. John Hunter (1728–1793), a Scottish surgeon and medical researcher, established a private press in 1786 at his house at 13 Castle Street, Leicester Square, in West End of London, in an attempt to prevent unauthorized publication of cheap and foreign editions of his works. His first book from his private press: A Treatise on the Venereal Disease. One thousand copies of the first edition were printed.

Academics
Porter Garnett (1871–1951), of Carnegie Mellon University, was an exponent of the anti-industrial values of the great private presses – namely those of Kelmscott, Doves, and Ashendene. Following Garnett's inspirational proposal to Carnegie Mellon, Garnett designed and inaugurated on April 7, 1923, the institute's Laboratory Press – for the purpose of teaching printing, which he believed was the first private press devoted solely for that purpose. The press closed in 1935.

Selected private presses
United States

 
 
 
 
 
 
 
 
 
 
 
 
 
 
 
 

Canada
 
 

Ireland
 

United Kingdom
 
 
 
 
 
 
 
 
 
 
 
 
 
 
 

France
 
 
 
 
 

Asia-Pacific
 
 

Western Asia

Opponents of the private press movement 
William Addison Dwiggins (1880–1956), a commercial artist, is lauded for high quality work, namely with Alfred Knopf. And, in contrast to many first-rate book designers joining private presses, he refused.  Historian Paul Shaw explained, "He had no patience with those who insisted on retaining hand processes in printing and publishing in the belief that they were inherently superior to machine processes." Dwiggins's "principal concern ultimately centered on readers and their reading needs, esthetic as well as financial. [His] goal was to make books that were beautiful, functional, and inexpensive."

Gallery

See also
 

 Alternative media
 Arts and Crafts movement
 Bookbinding
 Fine press
 Israeli printmaking
 Small press
 Private Internet connections vs. onion routing
 Private Libraries Association
 City Lights Bookstore of San Francisco

References

Further reading

 Will Ransom, Private Presses and Their Books. New York City: R. R. Bowker, 1929; 
 Roderick Cave, The Private Press (2nd ed.). New York City: R. R. Bowker, 1983; 
 Johanna Drucker, The Century of Artists' Books. New York City: Granary Books, 1995
 Colin Franklin, The Private Presses London: Studio Vista Ltd. (1969); 
 Colin Franklin, The Private Presses (2nd ed.). Aldershot: Scolar Press; Brookfield: Gower Publishing Company, 1991; 
 John Carter, ABC for Book Collectors. Oak Knoll Press, 1995; 
 Charles L. Pickering, HMI, The Private Press Movement, an address by Pickering to the Manchester Society of Book Collectors, Maidstone, Kent: Maidstone College of Art, School of Printing (1967); 
 Gilbert Turner (1911–1983), The Private Press: Its Achievement and Influence, Birmingham, England: Association of Assistant Librarians, Midland Division (1954); 
 The Private Press Today, for the 17th King's Lynn Festival: an exhibition, arranged by Juliet Standing, designed to show the scope and quality of work produced during the last few years at various private presses [etc.], illustrations by Rigby Graham, The Riverside Room, July 22–29, 1967, published at The Orchard, Wymondham, Leicestershire by the Brewhouse Press (1967); ; 
 Bruce Emmerson Bellamy, Private Publishing and Printing Press in England Since 1945, New York City: K. G. Saur Publishing; London: Clive Bingley (1980); ;  (U.S.);  (U.K.)

External links
 The Private Libraries Association
 International Register of Private Press Names

Printing
Publishing
Book collecting
Arts and Crafts movement

Printing terminology